Yanjiao railway station is a railway station in Yanjiao, Sanhe, Langfang, Hebei, China. It is on the Beijing–Qinhuangdao railway and Beijing–Tangshan intercity railway.

History
The station opened in 1981. In April 2021, reconstruction of the station began as part of the Beijing–Tangshan intercity railway project.

References

Railway stations in Hebei
Railway stations in China opened in 1981